The Daily Mirror investigators who exposed rogues in the Thursday edition of the paper between 1999 and 2006.
Journalists Andrew Penman and Michael Greenwood found the cheats and confronted them.

The investigations column, launched in 1997, was originally called Sorted and edited by Penman and Gary Jones. Jones was later replaced by Dawn Alford and then Greenwood in 1999.
It was renamed Penman and Greenwood Investigate in 2004, later becoming Penman and Sommerlad Investigate. It is now just Penman Investigates.

The FreelanceUK website reports that they were crowned "UK scam-busters" of 2005 after winning the title of National Consumer Journalists of the Year, they won the award again in 2006.

According to the Press Gazette the red top duo were commended for their journalistic efforts by a panel of independent judges who said “They don’t mind calling a scumbag a scumbag. They spotlight some major scams with a mix of dramatic journalism and plenty of humour.”

Alan Milburn MP presented the Trading Standards Institute award.
The Daily Mirror said the ultimate accolade was represented by the fact that some of the swindlers had failed to sue or have lodged failed complaints with the Press Complaints Commission.

External links
 Daily Mirror investigations column
 National Consumer Journalist of the Year
 Journalisted - Articles by Penman & Sommerlad

British investigative journalists
Daily Mirror